Antonio Scalvati (1559–1619) was an Italian painter, mainly active in Rome. He was known for his portraits.

Biography
Born in Bologna, Scalvati began as assistant for Tomasso Laureti, and then moved to Rome under Pope Gregory XIII.

He was employed in various projects in Rome including the Hall of Constantine in the Vatican Palace and the Vatican Library under Sixtus V. He painted portraits including of Pope Clement VIII, Leo XI, and Paul V. The portrait of Leo XI is now in the church of Sant'Agnese in Piazza Navona.

He appears to have been ill and bedridden much of his life. He died in Rome.

References

1557 births
1619 deaths
16th-century Italian painters
Italian male painters
17th-century Italian painters
Italian Baroque architects
Painters from Bologna